The Fighting American (also known as The Fighting Adventurer) is a surviving 1924 American silent romantic drama film produced and distributed by Universal Pictures and directed by Tom Forman. The young Mary Astor plays a young college coed who is the object of desire in the eyes of the hero.<ref>"Catalog: 'The Fighting American'. 'The American Film Institute Catalog Feature Films: 1921-30. Los Angeles:  The American Film Institute, c. 1971.</ref>

Plot
Bill Pendleton (Patrick H. O'Malley, Jr.), son of a wealthy shipowner, goes to fight in the war as a pilot. He has trouble concentrating on his studies and as a happy-go-lucky college student adept at both flying and football, he accepts a wager from his fraternity pals that he will propose to any girl in the college they choose.

Mary O'Malley (Mary Astor) is chosen by his pals and, unaware of the wager, accepts Bill's fraternity pin. She is an old-fashioned coed who is secretly in love with him. Bill having proposed to her in earnest, is also in love. Mary, however, hears about the wager and thoroughly disgusted with Bill, leaves college and goes to China to join her missionary father (Alfred Fisher).

A remorseful Bill ends up being kicked out of college, and his father also disowns him. He decides to follow Mary to China in order to redeem himself. He stows away on the same ship that Mary is taking to China.

When the Chinese revolutionary, Fu Shing (Warner Oland), kidnaps Mary, Bill has to figure out how to save her. He enlists the help of his friend, Danny Daynes (Raymond Hatton), an alcoholic war veteran now serving as a general in the Chinese army.

In an exciting battle in the sky, Bill ends up rescuing Mary and her father from a band of revolutionaries.

Cast

Patrick H. O'Malley, Jr. as Bill Pendleton
Mary Astor as Mary O'Mallory
Raymond Hatton as Denny Daynes and Po-Hsing-Chien
Warner Oland as Fu Shing
Taylor Carroll as W.F. Pendleton
Clarence Geldart as William A. Pendleton
Alfred Fisher as Mr. O'Mallory
Jack Byron as Alfred Rutland
James Wang as Lee Yong
Emmett King as College Professor
Jane Starr as Lizzie
Frank Kingsley as Harry March
Ed Brady 

Production
The plot of The Fighting American was a romantic satire penned by William Elwell Oliver, the winner of a writing contest that Universal Studios held for college students. The working title of the film was  "The Throwback."

A spectacular aerial stunt appeared in The Fighting American where two stuntmen fought on the wings of a Curtiss JN-4 with one stuntman falling off the wing. Instead of falling to his death, the falling stuntman doubled by former circus acrobat Russel Benton, swung in pendulum style onto the other wing tip. 

Two Curtiss JN-4s flew out of Clover Field near Houston, with one acting as a camera platform flown by Frank Tomick and the other aircraft flown by Leo Nomis.

Reception
The review in The New York Times considered The Fighting American as "pleasant nonsense". The review noted: "In the introductory title of "The Fighting American," the film presentation at the Broadway this week, Carl Laemmle, President of Universal Pictures Corporation, explains that the production is not one to tax the mentality of the spectators, who must look upon the narrative as nonsense."

Reviewer Janiss Garza recounted in her review for Allmovie.com, that some aerial scenes in The Fighting American were exciting.

Preservation
Prints of The Fighting American exist in private film collections [16mm reduction positives, 8mm reduction positives].

References
Notes

Citations

Bibliography

 Wynne, H. Hugh. The Motion Picture Stunt Pilots and Hollywood's Classic Aviation Movies''. Missoula, Montana: Pictorial Histories Publishing Co., 1987. .

External links

Lobby poster
 (Library of Congress copy)

1924 films
American aviation films
American silent feature films
Films directed by Tom Forman
Films based on short fiction
Universal Pictures films
1924 drama films
Silent American drama films
American black-and-white films
1920s American films